Bridge in Brown Township is a historic lattice truss bridge spanning Pine Creek at PA 414 in Brown Township, Lycoming County, Pennsylvania. It was built in 1890, by the Berlin Iron Bridge Co. of East Berlin, Connecticut.

It was added to the National Register of Historic Places in 1988.

Gallery

See also
List of bridges documented by the Historic American Engineering Record in Pennsylvania

References

External links

, includes structural engineering analysis of Upper Bridge at Slate Run

Historic American Engineering Record in Pennsylvania
Road bridges on the National Register of Historic Places in Pennsylvania
Bridges completed in 1890
Bridges in Lycoming County, Pennsylvania
1890 establishments in Pennsylvania
National Register of Historic Places in Lycoming County, Pennsylvania
Lattice truss bridges in the United States